Jean-Marie Grenot (28 March 1929 – 15 January 1997) was a French boxer. He competed in the men's bantamweight event at the 1948 Summer Olympics.

References

1929 births
1997 deaths
French male boxers
Olympic boxers of France
Boxers at the 1948 Summer Olympics
Bantamweight boxers